The New Evening Whirl is a newspaper published in St. Louis, Missouri. It was started by Benjamin Thomas in 1938. It is known for its focus on local crime in the St. Louis area and its non-traditional headlines. Kevin Thomas is publisher and Anthony Sanders is editor, and claims a readership of 100,000.

References

External links 
 
The Evening Whirl Finding Aid at the St. Louis Public Library

Newspapers published in St. Louis
Newspapers published in Missouri